The first Shadow Cabinet of Italy was launched by Achille Occhetto, Secretary of the Italian Communist Party from 1988 to 1991. The shadow cabinet was officially presented on 19 July 1989.

References

See also
Shadow Cabinet of Italy (2008)

Politics of Italy
Shadow cabinets